Battle of Augustov, Augustów, Augustovo, Augustowo, Augustow or Augustavas may refer to one of the following events:

 Two battles during World War I:
 Battle of Augustów (1914), also known as the Battle of the Niemen 
 Second Battle of the Masurian Lakes (1915)
 Several actions during the Polish–Lithuanian War of 1919–20